"Music for a Sushi Restaurant" is a song by English singer Harry Styles, from his third studio album Harry's House (2022). It was released to hot adult contemporary radio on 3 October 2022, as the album's third single. The song was written by Styles, Thomas Hull, Tyler Johnson and Mitch Rowland, while production was handled by Kid Harpoon and Johnson. A music video for the song was later released on 27 October 2022.

Background
Harry Styles announced the title of his third studio album as Harry's House on 23 March 2022, unveiling its artwork, a 40-second trailer and the album's release date as 20 May 2022.

Styles spoke in an interview with Leila Fadel of NPR after the release of the album and revealed the story behind the track:

Promotion
The song was used as the soundtrack for an advertisement for Apple AirPods, which featured Styles scat singing along with pink, red and blue dancers in front of cycles of color — a nod to Apple's iconic "Silhouette" advertisements of the 2000s. Styles requested that Apple donate the artist fee for his appearance in the commercial to the International Rescue Committee (IRC).

Music video 
The music video for "Music for a Sushi Restaurant" was directed by Aube Perrie and released on 27 October 2022. The video was initially teased on 20 October 2022 through a commercial and website promoting the fictional "Gill's Lounge", the restaurant depicted in the music video.

The video features Styles as a human-squid hybrid that is washed ashore and found by several owners of a restaurant, who plan to cook him into sushi. Styles reveals his singing ability and takes control of the restaurant, making the owners his servants. The restaurant is turned into a lounge where Styles performs. While performing, Styles loses his voice, and the owners drag him away and turning him into sushi. The video ends with the lounge turning into a sushi restaurant.

Commercial performance
Following the release of its parent album Harry's House, "Music for a Sushi Restaurant" entered at number 8 on the Billboard Hot 100 dated June 4, 2022, becoming one of the four top-ten entries; the others being "As It Was", "Late Night Talking" and "Matilda" which peaked at numbers one, three and nine, respectively.

Prior to being released as a single, "Music for a Sushi Restaurant" began to chart on the Mainstream Top 40 at number 40 on the issue dated July 23, 2022, and later peaked at number 9.

Charts

Weekly charts

Year-end charts

Certifications

Release history

References

2022 songs
Harry Styles songs
Songs written by Harry Styles
Songs written by Kid Harpoon
Songs written by Tyler Johnson (musician)
Song recordings produced by Kid Harpoon
Song recordings produced by Tyler Johnson (musician)
Mermen
Mermaids in popular culture